Outlane is a village in Kirklees, West Yorkshire, England, situated approximately  south-west of Elland,  north-west of Huddersfield and  south of Halifax.

The village is situated next to the M62 motorway near Junction 23 and straddles the Kirklees and Calderdale borough boundary; while the bulk of the village is within Kirklees, the north-western part of the village is part of Calderdale and the Stainland & District civil parish. The A640 Huddersfield to Rochdale road passes through the village.

Outlane Cricket Club, who currently play in the Halifax Cricket League, objected to the building of the motorway in the 1960s as it would go through their ground. However the Ministry of Transport turned down the objection. Outlane has a golf course that borders the motorway.

Slack Lane is the location of Slack Roman fort, whose Roman name was possibly Cambodunum.

See also
Listed buildings in Colne Valley (eastern area)
Listed buildings in Greetland and Stainland

References

External links
 Outlane cricket club website
 Outlane CC The History of Cricket in Kirklees and Calderdale
 Outlane Golf Club website

Geography of Huddersfield